Pinta Art Show annually exhibits modern and contemporary artworks from Latin American artists in international settings. Based in New York City, the art fair also travels to London, allowing visitors, galleries, artists, collectors, curators, and cultural institutions to strengthen their existing knowledge and develop new connections with the Latin American art world. Pinta features works by both emergent and established visual artists. Art pieces range in diversity from concrete, neo-concrete, and kinetic to conceptual and abstract.

Background 

Pinta New York takes place in New York City every year; its first exhibition occurred in 2007. The show coincides with Christie's and Sotheby's Latin American art auctions as well as several major exhibitions in museums and cultural institutions during the month of November. This art fair was the first to focus solely on Latin American artists to be held in New York City.

Pinta London premiered from 3–6 June 2010 at Earls Court Exhibition Centre, featuring approximately 50 galleries from the Americas and Europe.

As of 2007, Pinta is headed by Diego Costa Peuser, Alejandro Zaia and Mauro Herlitzka. Diego Costa Peuser, the Fair Director, is currently the publisher of Arte al Día Internacional magazine, and he is also the director of the arteaméricas fair in Miami and of Buenos Aires Photo. Chairman Alejandro Zaia is also Chair of Conexion PR/ZCM, a public relations firm based in Miami and South America. Mauro Herlitzka, Pinta's Institutional Director, is the current President of Fundación Espigas.

New York, U.S. Exhibitions

2011 

Held from 10–13 November 2011.

2010 

Held from 11–14 November at Pier 92. Featured artists including:

2009 

Held from 19–22 November at Metropolitan Pavilion. Featured artists included:

2008 

Held from 13–16 November at Metropolitan Pavilion, with 56 galleries. Featured artists included:

2007 

Held from 16–20 November at Metropolitan Pavilion, with 34 galleries. Featured artists included:

London, U.K. Exhibitions

2011 

Held from 6–9 June at Earls Court Exhibition Centre. Featured artists include:

Galleries in attendance:

2010 

Held from 3–6 June at Earls Court Exhibition Centre. Including featured artists:

References

External links 
  Pinta Art Fair Website

Articles
  ArtSlant PINTA London 2011 Exhibition Details
  "PINTA Londres 2011 La Feria de Arte Latinoamericano."
  EL PAISAJE CONTEMPORANEO. "PINTA Londres 2011"
  Artdaily.org. "Pinta London: A New Chapter in the Expansion of Latin American Art"
  "The shock of the nuevo"
  "Interview with Mauro Herlitzka, Director of PINTA Art Fair 09"
http://www.pintamiami.com/2018-Catalog

Videos
  "PINTA/PRIMERA FERIA DE ARTE CONTEMPORANEO LATINOAMERICANO EN NUEVA YORK 2007"
  "Pinta Art Fair - New York City - 2008"
  "PINTA 2009 ART FAIR NEW YORK"
  "PINTA 2009 PUBLIC PROGRAMS"
  "Zaia Pinta New York 2010"
  "Pinta New York 2010"
  "Trinidad Fombella @ NBC News"

Art fairs